Sue Whyatt is a former England women's international footballer. Whyatt played for  Macclesfield Ladies.

International career
Whyatt made her only appearance for England against Scotland on 23 June 1973, in England's 8–0 win at Manor Park, Nuneaton. She came on a second-half substitute in the 64th minute.

References

Living people
People from Macclesfield
English women's footballers
England women's international footballers
Women's association football goalkeepers
Year of birth missing (living people)